The Das Salinas River is a river of Goiás state in central Brazil.

See also
List of rivers of Goiás

References
Brazilian Ministry of Transport

Rivers of Federal District (Brazil)
Rivers of Goiás